A triple play is a baseball play in which three outs are made as a result of continuous action without any intervening errors or pitches between outs.

Triple play may also refer to:

 Triple play (telecommunications), the grouping of Internet access, TV and telephone service 
 Triple play, a group of methods for distributing Mobile digital TV 
 Triple Play (FIRST), a game for the 2005 FIRST Robotics competition
 Triple Play, a 1974 film by Ray Dennis Steckler
 Triple Play, a 1997 book by Elizabeth Gunn
 A kind of multi-play video poker
 A thin type of magnetic tape
 Triple Play series, a baseball video game series by EA Sports
 Triple Play, a pricing game played for 3 cars on The Price Is Right
 Triple Play, a game show sketch on PBS' Square One Television
 A Triple Play (optical discs), which provides the buyer with three formats of the movie or TV show they have purchased
 Triple Play (film), a 2004 American film starring Zac Efron
 Triple Play (Johnny Hodges album), 1967
 Triple Play (Martin Pizzarelli album)